Mohave or Mojave (Mojave: 'Aha Makhav) are a Native American people indigenous to the Colorado River in the Mojave Desert. The Fort Mojave Indian Reservation includes territory within the borders of California, Arizona, and Nevada. The Colorado River Indian Reservation includes parts of California and Arizona and is shared by members of the Chemehuevi, Hopi, and Navajo peoples.

The original Colorado River and Fort Mojave reservations were established in 1865 and 1870, respectively. Both reservations include substantial senior water rights in the Colorado River; water is drawn for use in irrigated farming.

The four combined tribes sharing the Colorado River Indian Reservation function today as one geo-political unit known as the federally recognized Colorado River Indian Tribes; each tribe also continues to maintain and observe its individual traditions, distinct religions, and culturally unique identities.

Culture

In the 1930s, George Devereux, a Hungarian-French anthropologist, did fieldwork and lived among the Mohave for an extended period of study. He published extensively about their culture and incorporated psychoanalytic thinking in his interpretation of their culture.

Language
The Mojave language belongs to the River Yuman branch of the Yuman language family. In 1994 approximately 75 people in total on the Colorado River and Fort Mojave reservations spoke the language, according to linguist Leanne Hinton. The tribe has published language materials, and there are new efforts to teach the language to their children.

Religion
The Mohave creator is Matevilya, who gave the people their names and their commandments. His son is Mastamho, who gave them the River and taught them how to plant. Historically this was an agrarian culture; they planted in the fertile floodplain of the untamed river, following the age-old customs of the Aha cave. They have traditionally used the indigenous plant Datura as a deliriant hallucinogen in a religious sacrament. A Mohave who is coming of age must consume the plant in a rite of passage, in order to enter a new state of consciousness.

History

Much of early Mojave history remains unrecorded in writing, since the Mojave language was not written in precolonial times. They depended on oral communication to transmit their history and culture from one generation to the next. Disease, outside cultures and encroachment on their territory disrupted their social organization. Together with having to adapt to a majority culture of another language, this resulted in interrupting the Mojave transmission of their stories and songs to the following generations.

The tribal name has been spelled in Spanish and English transliteration in more than 50 variations, such as Hamock avi, Amacava, A-mac-ha ves, A-moc-ha-ve, Jamajabs, and Hamakhav. This has led to misinterpretations of the tribal name, also partly traced to a translation error in Frederick W. Hodge's 1917 Handbook of the American Indians North of Mexico (1917). This incorrectly defined the name Mohave as being derived from hamock, (three), and avi, (mountain). According to this source, the name refers to the mountain peaks known as The Needles in English, located near the Colorado River. (The city of Needles, California is located a few miles north from here). But, the Mojave call these peaks Huukyámpve, which means "where the battle took place," referring to the battle in which the God-son, Mastamho, slew the sea serpent.

Ancestral lands

The Mojave held lands along the river that stretched from Black Canyon, where the tall pillars of First House of Mutavilya loomed above the river, past Avi kwame or Spirit Mountain, the center of spiritual things, to the Quechan Valley, where the lands of other tribes began. As related to contemporary landmarks, their lands began in the north at Hoover Dam and ended about one hundred miles below Parker Dam on the Colorado River, or aha kwahwat in Mojave. The most famous incident in the nineteenth center was the adoption of Olive Oatman after her family was massacred by another tribe, all prior to them living on the reservation.

19th–20th centuries

In mid-April 1859, United States troops, led by Lieutenant Colonel William Hoffman, on the Expedition of the Colorado, moved upriver into Mojave country with the well-publicized objective of establishing a military post. By this time, white immigrants and settlers had begun to encroach on Mojave lands and the post was intended to protect east-west European-American emigrants from attack by the Mojave.  Hoffman sent couriers among the tribes, warning that the post would be gained by force if they or their allies chose to resist. During this period, several members of the Rose-Baley Party were massacred by the Mojave. The Mojave warriors withdrew as Hoffman's armada approached and the army, without conflict, occupied land near the future Fort Mojave.   Hoffman ordered the Mojave men to assemble on April 23, 1859 at the armed stockade adjacent to his headquarters, to hear Hoffman' terms of peace.  Hoffman gave them the choice of submission or extermination and the Mojave chose submission.   At that time the Mojave population was estimated to be about 4,000, which composed 22 clans identified by totems.

Under American law the Mohave were to live on the Colorado River Reservation after its establishment in 1865. However, many refused to leave their ancestral homes in the Mojave Valley.  At this time, under jurisdiction of the War Department, officials declined to try to force them onto the reservation and the Mojave in the area were relatively free to follow their tribal ways.  In the midsummer of 1890, after the end of the Indian Wars, the War Department withdrew its troops and the post was transferred to the Office of Indian Affairs within the Department of the Interior.

Beginning in August 1890, the Office of Indian Affairs began an intensive program of assimilation where Mohave, and other native children living on reservations, were forced into boarding schools in which they learned to speak, write, and read English.  This assimilation program, which was Federal policy, was based on the belief that this was the only way native peoples could survive.  Fort Mojave was converted into a boarding school for local children and other "non-reservation" Indians.  Until 1931, forty-one years later, all Fort Mojave boys and girls between the ages of six and eighteen were compelled to live at this school or to attend an advanced Indian boarding school far removed from Fort Mojave.

The assimilation helped to break up tribal culture and governments.  In addition to English, schools taught American culture and customs and insisted that the children follow them; students were required to adopt European-American hairstyles (which included hair cutting), clothing, habits of eating, sleeping, toiletry, manners, industry, and language.  Use of their own language or customs was a punishable offense; at Fort Mojave five lashes of the whip were issued for the first offense.   Such corporal punishment of children scandalized the Mojave, who did not discipline their children in that way.

As part of the assimilation the administrators assigned English names to the children and registered as members of one of two tribes, the Mojave Tribe on the Colorado River Reservation and the Fort Mojave Indian Tribe on the Fort Mojave Indian Reservation. These divisions did not reflect the traditional Mojave clan and kinship system.  By the late 1960s, thirty years after the end of the assimilation program 18 of the 22 traditional clans had survived.

Population
Estimates of the pre-contact populations of most native groups in California have varied substantially. Alfred L. Kroeber (1925:883) put the 1770 population of the Mohave at 3,000 and Francisco Garcés, a Franciscan missionary-explorer, also estimated the population at 3,000 in 1776 (Garcés 1900(2):450).

A.L. Kroeber estimate of the population in 1910 was 1,050. By 1963 Lorraine M. Sherer's research revealed the population had shrunk to approximately 988, with 438 at Fort Mojave and 550 of the Colorado River Reservation.

Current status
The Mohave, along with the Chemehuevi, some Hopi, and some Navajo, share the Colorado River Indian Reservation and function today as one geopolitical unit known as the federally recognized Colorado River Indian Tribes; each tribe also continues to maintain and observe its individual traditions, distinct religions, and culturally unique identities. The Colorado River Indian Tribes headquarters, library and museum are in Parker, Arizona, about 40 miles (64 km) north of I-10. The Colorado River Indian Tribes Native American Days Fair & Expo is held annually in Parker, from Thursday through Sunday during the first week of October. The Megathrow Traditional Bird Singing & Dancing social event is also celebrated annually, on the third weekend of March. RV facilities are available along the Colorado River.

See also
 Mohave traditional narratives
 Blythe geoglyphs
 Fort Mohave, Arizona
 Bullhead City, Arizona
 Population of Native California
 Hi-wa itck, a syndrome triggered by separation from a loved one

References

Further reading
 Devereux, George. 1935. "Sexual Life of the Mohave Indians", unpublished PhD Dissertation, Department of Anthropology, University of California.
 Devereux, George. 1937. "Institutionalized Homosexuality of the Mohave Indians". Human Biology 9:498–527.
 Devereux, George. 1939. "Mohave Soul Concepts," American Anthropologist 39:417–422.
 Devereux, George. 1939. "Mohave Culture and Personality". Character and Personality 8:91–109, 1939.
 Devereux, George. 1938. "L'envoûtement chez les Indiens Mohave. Journal de la Société des Americanistes de Paris 29:405–412.
 Devereux, George. 1939. "The Social and Cultural Implications of Incest among the Mohave Indians". Psychoanalytic Quarterly 8:510–533.
 Devereux, George. 1941. "Mohave Beliefs Concerning Twins". American Anthropologist 43:573–592.
 Devereux, George. 1942. "Primitive Psychiatry (Part II)". Bulletin of the History of Medicine 11:522–542.
 Devereux, George. 1947. "Mohave Orality". Psychoanalytic Quarterly 16:519–546.
 Devereux, George. 1948. The Mohave Indian Kamalo:y. Journal of Clinical Psychopathology.
 Devereux, George. 1950. "Heterosexual Behavior of the Mohave Indians". Psychoanalysis and the Social Sciences 2(1):85–128.
 Devereux, George. 1948. "Mohave Pregnancy". Acta Americana 6:89–116.
 Fathauer, George, H.. 1951.  "Religion in Mohave Social Structure", The Ohio Journal of Science, 51(5), September 1951, pp. 273–276.
 Forde, C. Daryll. 1931. "Ethnography of the Yuma Indians". University of California Publications in American Archeology and Ethnology 28:83–278.
 Garcés, Francisco. 1900. On the Trail of a Spanish Pioneer: The Diary and Itinerary of Francisco Garcés. Edited by Elliott Coues. 2 vols. Harper, New York. (on-line)
 Hall, S. H. 1903. "The Burning of a Mohave Chief," Out West 18:60–65.
 Hodge, Frederick W. (ed.) Handbook of the American Indians North of Mexico (2 vols., Washington, D.C., 1917), I, 919
 Ives, Lt. Joseph C. 1861. Report Upon the Colorado River of the West, 36th Cong., 1st Sess., Senate Exec. Doc. Pt. I, 71. Washington, D.C.
 Kroeber, A. L. 1925. Handbook of the Indians of California. Bureau of American Ethnology Bulletin No. 78. Washington, D.C.
 Sherer, Lorraine M. 1966. "Great Chieftains of the Mohave Indians". Southern California Quarterly 48(1):1–35. Los Angeles, California.
 Sherer, Lorraine M. 1967. "The Name Mojave, Mohave: A History of its Origin and Meaning". Southern California Quarterly 49(4):1–36. Los Angeles, California.
 Sherer, Lorraine M. and Frances Stillman. 1994. Bitterness Road: The Mojave, 1604–1860, Menlo Park, California: Ballena Press.
 Stewart, Kenneth M. 1947. "An Account of the Mohave Mourning Ceremony". American Anthropologist 49:146–148.
 Whipple, Lt. Amiel Weeks. 1854. "Corps of Topographical Engineers Report". Pt. I, 114.
 White, Helen C. 1947. Dust on the King's Highway. Macmillan, New York.
 Report of the Secretary of the Interior, 1890–1891, II, vi
 Reports of the Secretary of the Interior, 1891–1930, containing the annual reports of the superintendents of the Fort Mojave School from 1891 through 1930.
 Pritzker, Barry M. A Native American Encyclopedia: History, Culture, and Peoples. Oxford: Oxford University Press, 2000. .
 Sherer, Lorraine Miller. 1965. "The Clan System of the Fort Mojave Indians: A Contemporary Survey." Southern California Quarterly 47(1):1–72. Los Angeles, California.
 Zappia, Natale A. (2014). Traders and Raiders: The Indigenous World of the Colorado Basin, 1540–1859. Chapel Hill, NC: University of North Carolina Press.

External links

 Fort Mojave Indian Tribe, official website
 Colorado River Indian Tribes, official website
 Colorado River Indian Tribes Public Library/Archive
 National Park Service: History & Culture
 "Creation Songs of the Mohave people", NPR audio documentary

 
Native American tribes in Arizona
Native American tribes in California
Native American tribes in Nevada
Mojave Desert